Black holes, objects whose gravity is so strong that nothing including light can escape them, have been depicted in fiction since before the term was coined by John Archibald Wheeler in the late 1960s. The earliest stories featuring what would later be called black holes, such as E. E. Smith's 1928 story The Skylark of Space and its "black sun", typically portrayed them as hazards to spacefarers. Later works such as the 1975 Space: 1999 episode "Black Sun" have occasionally done likewise, and a few have even depicted black holes being outright weaponized, one example being the 1982 novel The Space Eater by David Langford.

A concept portrayed in many early works featuring black holes is that of gravitational time dilation—whereby time passes more slowly closer to a black hole as a consequence of general relativity—seen in works like Poul Anderson's 1968 short story "Kyrie" as well as Frederik Pohl's 1977 novel Gateway and the rest of his Heechee Saga; the opposite effect of using a black hole for the purpose of time travel to the past is depicted in the 1967 Star Trek episode "Tomorrow Is Yesterday". Black holes have also been portrayed as ways to travel through space rather than time, acting as entrances to wormholes in works such as the 1974 novel The Forever War by Joe Haldeman. Other uses of black holes have been conceived, one being as a source of energy as in Gregory Benford's 1986 short story "As Big As the Ritz". Micro black holes were first depicted in Larry Niven's 1974 short story "The Hole Man", and were later used as a means of powering spaceship propulsion in the 1975 novel Imperial Earth by Arthur C. Clarke and a way to provide an artificial gravity of sorts in Charles Sheffield's novel Proteus Unbound from 1989. Conversely, an enormous yet low-density black hole appears in Barry N. Malzberg's 1975 novel Galaxies.

Black holes have been depicted with varying degrees of accuracy to the scientific understanding of them. Because what lies beyond the event horizon is unknown and by definition unobservable from outside, authors have been free to employ artistic license when depicting the interiors of black holes. The 1979 Disney film The Black Hole features a completely fictionalized version of a black hole, both with regard to its outside and its inside. Anthropomorphized, thinking black holes are seen in a handful of works including Benford's 2000 novel Eater.

References

External links
Science Fiction Stories with Good Astronomy and Physics: A Topical Index

 
Fiction